The Seychelles Federation of Workers' Unions (SFWU) is a national trade union center in Seychelles.

The SFWU is affiliated with the International Trade Union Confederation.

References

Trade unions in Seychelles
International Trade Union Confederation